= Sorghum production in Chad =

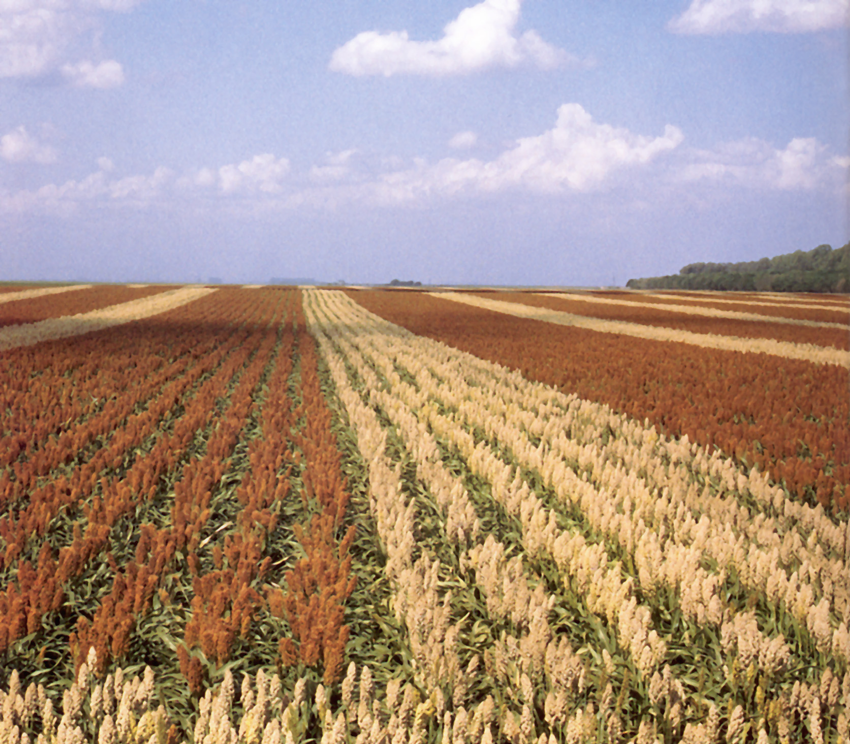
A field of hybrid sorghum.

Sorghum production in Chad is one of the country's most important subsistence crops. In Chad, sorghum (Sorghum guineense) is a staple food crop which is also used as animal feed and for brewing beer. As of 2011, its production at the farm level was 650,000 tons from a cropped area of 792,667 hectares (1,958,720 acres) with a yield rate of 0.82 tons per hectare. It accounts for only 1.1% of world production and its world ranking is 17.
